is a railway station in the city of Toyokawa, Aichi Prefecture, Japan, operated by Central Japan Railway Company (JR Tōkai).

Lines
Nishi-Kozakai Station is served by the Tōkaidō Main Line, and is located 298.4 kilometers from the southern terminus of the line at Tokyo Station.

Station layout
The station has a two island platforms connected to the station building by a footbridge; however, track 1 is not in use. The station building has automated ticket machines, TOICA automated turnstiles and is staffed.

Platforms

Adjacent stations

|-
!colspan=5|Central Japan Railway Company

Station history
It was elevated to a full station under its present name on August 1, 1948. Regularly scheduled freight services were discontinued in 1972, and parcel services by 1984. With the dissolution and privatization of the JNR on April 1, 1987, the station came under the control of the Central Japan Railway Company (JR Tōkai). Automated turnstiles using the TOICA IC Card system came into operation from November 25, 2006.

Station numbering was introduced to the section of the Tōkaidō Line operated JR Central in March 2018; Nishi-Kozakai Station was assigned station number CA43.

Passenger statistics
In fiscal 2017, the station was used by an average of 1213 passengers daily.

Surrounding area
site of Ushikubo Castle
 Ushikubo Elementary School

See also
 List of Railway Stations in Japan

References
Yoshikawa, Fumio. Tokaido-sen 130-nen no ayumi. Grand-Prix Publishing (2002) .

External links

Railway stations in Japan opened in 1897
Railway stations in Aichi Prefecture
Tōkaidō Main Line
Stations of Central Japan Railway Company
Toyokawa, Aichi